The Oldenburg Class P 4.2 steam locomotives were German engines built for the Grand Duchy of Oldenburg State Railways (Großherzoglich Oldenburgische Staatseisenbahnen) between 1907 and 1909. They were based on the standard variant of the Prussian P 4.2, but there were a number of small differences such as a Ranafier steam dryer and, on three examples, a Lentz valve gear, a system widely used in Oldenburg. Production began in 1907 and eight engines were procured up to 1909.

The engines taken over by the Deutsche Reichsbahn were grouped as DRG Class 36.12 given numbers 36 1251 to 36 1258.

The locomotives used tenders of the 3 T 12 or 2'2' T 20 classes.

See also 
Grand Duchy of Oldenburg State Railways
List of Oldenburg locomotives and railbuses
Länderbahnen

Sources 

 
 

4-4-0 locomotives
P 4.2
Railway locomotives introduced in 1907
Hanomag locomotives
Standard gauge locomotives of Germany
2′B n2v locomotives

Passenger locomotives